Arbacia dufresnii is a species of sea urchin of the family Arbaciidae. Its armour is covered with spines.  A. dufresnii was first scientifically described in 1825 by Blainville.

See also 
 Araeosoma violaceum
 Arbacia crassispina
 Arbacia lixula

References 

Arbacioida
Animals described in 1825